Hanwell railway station serves Hanwell in the London Borough of Ealing.

From the 17 May 2020 timetable change, Hanwell station gained a Sunday service. In November 2021 the Ealing Civic Society recognized the quality of the renovations to the station building by awarding the station the society's annual award.

History
The station is on the original line of the Great Western Railway which opened on 4 June 1838, although Hanwell station was not ready until December of that year; it opened on 1 December. The station was renamed Hanwell and Elthorne on 1 April 1896, and reverted to Hanwell on 6 May 1974. Re-built circa 1875–77 some 250m east of its original location at the time the main line was quadrupled, it has been declared a grade II listed building by English Heritage.

The south entrance was closed in the 1970s, but reopened in December 2014 with funding from Ealing Council and Transport for London.

As part of the Crossrail project, Hanwell station gained step-free access via lifts from platform to ticket office level in early 2020.

Description

The station is sited a short distance east of the Grade I listed Wharncliffe Viaduct.

Some of the original station nameboards with the pre-1974 name Hanwell and Elthorne are still on the platforms (as seen in the photo on the left).

Services
All services at Hanwell are operated by the Elizabeth line using  EMUs.

The typical off-peak service in trains per hour is:
 4 tph to 
 2 tph to 
 2 tph to 

A Sunday service was introduced at the station is May 2020. Prior to this, the station was closed on Sundays.

From October 2008, Oyster "pay as you go" can be used for journeys originating or ending at Hanwell.

Connections
London Buses route E3 serves the station.

References

External links

Railway stations in the London Borough of Ealing
Railway stations in Great Britain opened in 1838
Former Great Western Railway stations
Railway stations served by the Elizabeth line
Railway station
Grade II listed buildings in the London Borough of Ealing
Grade II listed railway stations
1838 establishments in England